Jack Smith (June 23, 1895 – May 2, 1972) was an outfielder in Major League Baseball who played for the St. Louis Cardinals (1915–1926) and Boston Braves (1926–1929). Smith batted and threw left-handed. He was born in Chicago.

In a 15-season career, Smith posted a .287 batting average (1301-for-4532) with 783 runs, 40 home runs, 382 RBI and 228 stolen bases in 1406 games played. 

Smith died in Westchester, Illinois, at the age of 76.

Best season
 (1922): .310, 117 runs, 46 RBI, 158 hits, 23 doubles, 12 triples, 8 home runs

Highlights
Collected 228 stolen bases
6-times stole 20 or more bases (a career-high 32 in 1923)
Posted six .300 seasons (four straight, in 1920-23)
Had five straight hits as a pinch-hitter (1917)
Led National League with nine pinch-hits (1928)
As a right fielder, made an unassisted double play (August 25, 1925)

See also
List of Major League Baseball career stolen bases leaders

Sources
Baseball Library
Baseball Reference

 

Boston Braves players
St. Louis Cardinals players
Major League Baseball center fielders
Major League Baseball right fielders
Minor league baseball managers
London Tecumsehs (baseball) players
Toledo Mud Hens players
Baltimore Orioles (IL) players
York Dukes players
Kansas City Blues (baseball) players
1895 births
1972 deaths
Baseball players from Chicago